Diyan Georgiev Moldovanov (born 2 April 1985) is a Bulgarian footballer who currently plays as a defender for Sozopol.

References

External links

1985 births
Living people
Bulgarian footballers
Neftochimic Burgas players
PFC Pirin Blagoevgrad players
PFC Slavia Sofia players
PFC Nesebar players
FC Montana players
PFC Lokomotiv Plovdiv players
FC Sozopol players
First Professional Football League (Bulgaria) players
Association football defenders